Phrynocephalus kulagini, Kulagin's variegated toadhead agama, is a species of agamid lizard found in Mongolia and Russia.

References

kulagini
Reptiles described in 1909
Taxa named by Jacques von Bedriaga